The 1962 All-Atlantic Coast Conference football team consists of American football players chosen by various selectors for their All-Atlantic Coast Conference ("ACC") teams for the 1962 NCAA University Division football season. Selectors in 1962 included the Associated Press (AP) and the United Press International (UPI).  Players who were the consensus first-team selections of both the AP and UPI are displayed in bold.

All-Atlantic Coast selections

Ends
 Bob Lacey, North Carolina (AP-1, UPI-1)
 Pete Widener, Duke (AP-2, UPI-1)
 Don Montgomery, North Carolina State (AP-1)
 John Caskey, South Carolina (AP-2)

Tackles
 Art Gregory, Duke (AP-1, UPI-1)
 Don Chuy, North Carolina (AP-1, UPI-1)
 Jim Moss, South Carolina (AP-2)
 Dave Graham, Virginia (AP-2)

Guards
 Jean Berry, Duke (AP-1, UPI-1)
 Walter Rock, Maryland (AP-1, UPI-1)
 Bill Sullivan, North Carolina State (AP-2)
 Bob Rowley, Virginia (AP-2)

Centers
 Joe Craver, North Carolina (AP-1, UPI-1)
 Paul Bengel, Duke (AP-2)

Backs
 Dick Shiner, Maryland (AP-1 [quarterback], UPI-1 [quarterback])
 Billy Gambrell, South Carolina (AP-1 [halfback], UPI-1 [halfback])
 Mike Curtis, Duke (AP-1 [fullback], UPI-1)
 Mark Leggett, Duke (AP-2, UPI-1)
 Tom Brown, Maryland (AP-1 [halfback])
 Dan Reeves, South Carolina (AP-2)
 Ken Willard, North Carolina (AP-2)
 Joe Scarpati, North Carolina State (AP-2)

Key
AP = Associated Press, announced by the Atlantic Coast Sports Writers Association

UPI = United Press International

See also
1962 College Football All-America Team

References

All-Atlantic Coast Conference football team
All-Atlantic Coast Conference football teams